Mollia glabrescens is a species of flowering plant in the family Malvaceae sensu lato or Tiliaceae or Sparrmanniaceae. It is found only in Guyana.

References

Grewioideae
Endemic flora of Guyana
Vulnerable plants
Taxonomy articles created by Polbot